Uppermill or Upper Mill may refer to:

United Kingdom

Places

Uppermill, a village near Saddleworth, Greater Manchester.

Windmills

Upper Mill, Brundish, a windmill in Suffolk
Upper Mill, Combs, a windmill in Suffolk
Upper Mill, Eastry. a windmill in Kent
Upper Mill, Great Baddow, a windmill in Essex
Upper Mill, Hailsham, a windmill in East Sussex
Upper Mill, Hindringham, a windmill in Norfolk
Upper Mill, Hockwold, a drainage mill in Norfolk
Upper Mill, Walton, a windmill in Suffolk
Upper Mill, Woodchurch, a windmill in Kent

Watermills
Upper Mill, East Malling, a watermill on the East Malling Stream, Kent
Upper Mill, Loose, a watermill on the Loose Stream, Kent
Upper Mill, Oxted, a watermill on the River Eden, Surrey
Upper Mill, Shoreham, a watermill on the River Darent, Kent
Upper Mill, Ulcombe, a watermill on a tributary of the River Beult, Kent
Upper Mill, Wateringbury, a watermill on the Wateringbury Stream, Kent
Upper Paper Mill, St Mary's Cray, a watermill on the River Cray, Kent

United States
Russell Company Upper Mill, Middletown, CT, listed on the NRHP in Connecticut
Owings Upper Mill, Owings Mills, MD, listed on the NRHP in Maryland
Buck's Upper Mill Farm, Bucksville, SC, listed on the NRHP in South Carolina